Opoku Ware I (born 1700–1750) was the 2nd Asantehene of Oyoko heritage, who ruled the Ashanti Empire. He is credited with being the "empire builder" of the Ashanti.

Reign

Campaigns 
Opoku Ware subdued a revolt by the Akyem, Wassa, Aowin and Denkyira. This commenced with an attack on Akyem in 1720-21. In the early 18th century, Aowin King Ebrimoro invaded Kumasi. This invasion was defeated by Opoku Ware. Between 1719 and 1722, the Ashanti defeated the Aowin, claiming Ahafo which was an Aowin territory, as a part of the Ashanti Empire. In 1723-24 Opoku oversaw the invasion of the Bono state which made Bono a part of the empire. 

In 1726, Ashanti invaded Wassa forcing Wassa King Ntsiful I to move his capital to Abrade near the coast until the 19th century. In 1732, the Ashanti Empire invaded Western Gonja and Gyaman as well as Banda in 1740. Two years later, the Ashanti incorporated the Akyem states of Abuakwa and Kotoku. Eastern Gonja was absorbed into the state by 1744 with the conquest of Dagbon occuring from 1744-45.

Infrastructure 
L.F. Rømer records in 1760 that the King enlisted the services of four Dutch-men during his reign, to construct a distillery in Kumasi. According to historians Fage and Latorre, this attempt was unsuccessful. Opoku Ware introduced the thread of imported but unraveled woolen and silken textiles into the local cotton cloths. Danish agent Nog, visited Opoku Ware's court near the mid 18th century and observed this cloth factory set up by the King.

References

Bibliography 

1700 births
1750 deaths
18th-century monarchs in Africa
Ashanti monarchs